The Defence High Frequency Communications Service or the DHFCS is a British military beyond line-of-sight communication system operated by the Ministry of Defence (MOD) and used predominately by the UK Armed Forces, as well as other authorised users.  The system operates from six transmitting and receiving sites across the United Kingdom and is controlled from a network control centre located at Forest Moor in North Yorkshire and a backup site at Kinloss Barracks in Moray. Overseas sites are located in Ascension Island, Cyprus and Falkland Islands.  In 2003 VT Merlin Communications (now Babcock International Group) were awarded the contract to operate the system for a period of fifteen years on behalf of the Ministry of Defence.  The system is to be replaced by the Defence Strategic Radio Service (DSRS) also operated by Babcock

History

Legacy systems
Prior to the creation of the DHFCS, the Royal Air Force (RAF) and Royal Navy (RN) operated their own independent high frequency (HF) communications systems. The RAF's Strike Command Integrated Communications System (STCICS), later known as Terrestrial Air Sea Communications (TASCOMM), operated from six sites within the UK whilst the RN system had twelve sites. The systems overlapped in their capabilities whilst simultaneously having gaps in overall capability, high running costs, lack of flexibility and neither were used to their full capacity.

Public private partnership 

In 2003 the Ministry of Defence (MOD) decided to merge the existing high frequency communications systems into one enhanced system and thereafter operate and manage it as the Defence High Frequency Communications Service (DHFCS). The Defence Communication Services Agency (DCSA) (now Information Systems and Services (ISS) under Joint Forces Command) awarded a £228m public private partnership contract to VT Merlin Communications (now Babcock International Group) to upgrade and operate the system. The contract lasts for fifteen years (ending in 2018) and is funded by a reduction in the number of transmitting, receiving and control sites and a reduction of 266 military personnel.

Site rationalisation

Through the rationalisation of sites, twelve sites (four RAF, seven RN and a joint site in Gibraltar) were closed between 2003 and 2006. Many sites were used for other military purposes with the sites at Bampton Castle, Chelveston and Milltown being the only sites which closed entirely.

Closed legacy system sites

Purpose 
The service provides HF communications for the Ministry of Defence (Royal Air Force, Royal Navy, British Army and Joint Forces Command), other British government departments and NATO (including its Partnership for Peace organisation). A memorandum of understanding exists to allow cooperation between the DHFCS and the US Air Force's (USAF) High Frequency Global Communications System (HFGCS) through a link to the HFGCS at the USAF facility at RAF Croughton in Northamptonshire. A link with the Australian Defence Force's High Frequency Communications System (HFCS) based in Canberra also exists.

The service allows real-time strategic communications between users which comprise ground stations, submarines, surface vessels, fixed wing aircraft and helicopters.

Structure and operation 
The DHFCS was declared operational in March 2008. Within the UK, the system is divided into three stations of paired transmitter and receiver sites. 'UK North' comprises sites at Kinloss Barracks and Crimond in north east Scotland, 'UK Middle' at Forest Moor and Inskip in northern England and 'UK South' at St. Eval and Penhale Sands in south west England. Three overseas stations, with two sites each, are located in Cyprus, Ascension Island and the Falkland Islands.

The system was originally operated from a network control station (NCS) located at Forest Moor, with an alternate network control station (ANCS) at Kinloss which could be used in the event that Forest Moor station was unavailable. Split site working was introduced in 2011 which allows both the Forest Moor NCS and Kinloss ANCS to control 50% of the network, increasing resilience and recovery time in the event of a loss of service and minimising potential network unavailability.

Sites at Anthorn (Formerly HMS Nuthatch) and Skelton in northern England provide a Very Low Frequency (VLF) transmitting capability which is used to send communications to submerged submarines. Due to the low frequencies involved submarines can only receive VLF communications and do not carry VLF transmission aerials. Therefore, there is no requirement for land-based receiver sites as communications are one way.

The DHFCS is known to have the following capabilities.
 Nuclear Firing Chain (HF/LF Secure Data)
 Ship to shore Automatic Link Establishment (ALE), Non ALE (Secure Data) – STANAG 5066 ARQ & DRC
 Direct Access users Channels (Voice)
 Multi Channel Broadcasts (Secure Data)
 Single Channel Broadcasts (Data & Voice)
 NATO Broadcasts (Secure Data)
 Off the Air Monitoring (Secure Data)
 Legacy Ship to Shore Services (Secure Data)
 Rear Links Services (Secure Data)
 Maritime Air Telecommunication Organisation (Secure Data & Voice)
 Terrestrial Air Sea Communications (TASCOMM - Voice)
 Voice Automatic Link Establishment

DHFCS sites in the United Kingdom

Overseas DHFCS sites

References

Citations

Sources 
 
 
 

British Armed Forces
British military radio
History of telecommunications in the United Kingdom
Military communications of the United Kingdom
Military electronics of the United Kingdom
Organisations based in Harrogate
Organisations based in Moray
Science and technology in North Yorkshire